Jen Wong is an American business executive and current Chief Operating Officer of Reddit, overseeing its business strategy. Wong was previously president of digital and chief operating officer at Time Inc. and worked at McKinsey.

Under Wong's leadership, Reddit's ad revenue was expected to double in 2021 to $350 million. In addition, Wong has spoken publicly about Reddit's platform safety.

Wong was No. 4 on Fast Company’s 2021 Queer 50 list and No. 1 on their 2022 list.

References 

American chief operating officers
American women business executives
Reddit people
American LGBT businesspeople
Living people
Year of birth missing (living people)